The 1989–90 Liga Nacional de Fútbol Femenino was the second season of the Spanish women's football top tier. Atlético Villa de Madrid won their first title ever.

League table

References
Arquero Arba

Primera División (women) seasons
1989–90 in Spanish football leagues
1989–90 in Spanish women's football